Khamar is a rural locality (a selo) in Tlyaratinsky Selsoviet, Tlyaratinsky District, Republic of Dagestan, Russia. The population was 180 as of 2010.

Geography 
Khamar is located 7 km southeast of Tlyarata (the district's administrative centre) by road. Cherel is the nearest rural locality.

References 

Rural localities in Tlyaratinsky District